James Hamilton, 2nd Duke of Abercorn  (24 August 1838 – 3 January 1913), styled Viscount Hamilton until 1868 and Marquess of Hamilton from 1868 to 1885, was a British nobleman, groom of the stool, and diplomat. He was the son of James Hamilton, 1st Duke of Abercorn, and Lady Louisa Jane Russell.

Biography 
Lord Hamilton was born on 24 August 1838, the eldest son of James Hamilton, second marquess and later first duke of Abercorn (1811–1885), and his wife Lady Louisa Jane Russell (1812–1905), second daughter of John Russell, sixth duke of Bedford. He was educated, like his father, at Harrow and Christ Church, Oxford, where he matriculated on 28 May 1857. After graduating from Oxford with a BA in 1860, he entered Parliament as Conservative MP for County Donegal, a constituency he represented from 1860 to 1880. After serving as High Sheriff of Tyrone for 1863, he re-entered university and emerged with an M.A. in 1865 (he was created a Companion of the Order of the Bath the same year). That year, he also embarked upon a diplomatic mission to Denmark. He served as a Lord of the Bedchamber to the Prince of Wales from 1866 to 1885; in the latter year, he took over his father's position of Lord Lieutenant of County Donegal, and inherited his father's peerage titles. He led the Lords' reply to the Speech from the throne wearing the uniform of Lord Lieutenant of Donegal on 21 January 1886. He was chosen Grand Master of the Grand Lodge of Ireland in 1886, a post he held until his death. In 1887 he was appointed to the Privy Council of Ireland.

Abercorn held several positions after acceding to that title, including Groom of the Stool (1886–1891), and chairman of the British South Africa Company. In early 1901 he was appointed by King Edward to lead a special diplomatic mission to announce the King's accession to the governments of Denmark, Sweden and Norway, Russia, Germany and Saxony.

He was created a Knight of the Garter. He died of pneumonia in London at the age of 74. He is buried in the cemetery at Baronscourt Parish Church, the traditional burial place of the Dukes of Abercorn and their families.

In 1883 he held 76,500 acres in Tyrone and Donegal. He also held 2,100 acres in Scotland.

Family and children
In 1869 he married Lady Mary Anna Curzon-Howe (1848–1929), daughter of Anne Gore (bef. 1832–1877), daughter of Adm. Sir John Gore (d. 1836), and Richard Curzon-Howe, 1st Earl Howe (1796–1870). Together they had two daughters and seven sons:

James Albert Edward Hamilton, 3rd Duke of Abercorn (1869–1953)
Lord Claud Penn Alexander Hamilton (18 October 1871 – 18 October 1871) (same day)
Lord Charlie Hamilton (10 April 1874 – 10 April 1874) (same day)
Lady Alexandra Phyllis Hamilton (1876–1918), who had Princess Alexandra of Wales as sponsor at her baptism. She died when the RMS Leinster was torpedoed by a German U-boat and sank. She was unmarried.
Lord Claud Francis Hamilton (25 October 1878 – 25 December 1878) (aged 2 months)
Lady Gladys Mary Hamilton (1880–1917), who in 1902 married Ralph Francis Forward-Howard, 7th Earl of Wicklow (1877–1946). She was his first wife, and together they had one son.
Lord Arthur John Hamilton (1883–1914), who was Deputy Master of the Household from 1913, Captain in the Irish Guards and was killed in action at the First Battle of Ypres.
Lord (unnamed) Hamilton (31 October 1886 – 31 October 1886) (same day)
Lord Claud Nigel Hamilton (1889–1975), Captain in the Grenadier Guards, fought in the First World War and served in the household of King George V, his widow and Queen Elizabeth II as Deputy Master of the Household, as Extra Equerry, as Equerry in Ordinary and as Comptroller, Treasurer. In 1933 he married Violet Ruby Ashton. They had no children.

Honours and arms

British
 CB: Companion of the Bath (civil division), 1865
 KG: Knight of the Garter, 10 August 1892

Foreign
 :
 Commander of the Imperial Order of Leopold, 1881
 Order of the Iron Crown
 : S.K.: Grand Cross of the Dannebrog, 10 March 1888
 : Order of St. Anna

Ancestry

Notes

References

External links

"James Hamilton, 2nd Duke of Abercorn" at The Peerage

 

|-

1838 births
1913 deaths
Alumni of Christ Church, Oxford
102
High Sheriffs of Tyrone
Lord-Lieutenants of Donegal
Members of the Privy Council of Ireland
Hamilton, James Hamilton, Viscount
Hamilton, James Hamilton, Viscount
Hamilton, James Hamilton, Viscount
Hamilton, James Hamilton, Viscount
Hamilton, James Hamilton, Viscount
UK MPs who inherited peerages
North Irish Horse officers
Grooms of the Stool
Companions of the Order of the Bath
Knights of the Garter
Grand Crosses of the Order of the Dannebrog
Recipients of the Order of St. Anna
People educated at Harrow School